Green Glacier is a glacier on the west side of Haskell Ridge, flowing north from the Darwin Mountains of Antarctica into Darwin Glacier. It was mapped by the Darwin Glacier Party of the Commonwealth Trans-Antarctic Expedition, 1956–58, who named it because of the green color of its surface.

References

Glaciers of Oates Land